Alphonse Tavan (9 March 1833 – 12 May 1905) was a French Provençal poet.

Early life
Tavan was born in 1833 in Châteauneuf-de-Gadagne.

Career
On 21 May 1854, he co-founded the Félibrige movement with Joseph Roumanille, Frédéric Mistral, Théodore Aubanel, Jean Brunet, Paul Giéra and Anselme Mathieu.

He published a collection of romantic poems in Provençal, Amour e plour, in 1876.

He attended the fiftieth anniversary of the Félibrige on 22 May 1904 with Mistral; all the other co-founders had died.

Death
He died in 1905 in his hometown of Châteauneuf-de-Gadagne.

Legacy
His bust adorns a fountain in Châteauneuf-de-Gadagne.

The Collège Alphonse Tavan, a secondary school in Avignon, is named in his honour.

References

1833 births
1905 deaths
19th-century French poets
French male poets
People from Vaucluse
20th-century French poets
19th-century French male writers
20th-century French male writers